Harry Noon (6 October 1937 – 2 September 1996) was an English professional football player and coach.

Career
Born in Sutton-in-Ashfield, Noon played as a full back for Bentinck Methodists, Notts County, Bradford City and Wisbech Town.

He joined Bradford City in July 1962 and left them in February 1963. During his time with the club, he made one appearance in the Football League and one appearance in the FA Cup.

He later moved to Australia, where he was coach of Sydney Croatia during the 1984 season. He died in Sydney on 2 September 1996.

Sources

References

1937 births
1996 deaths
English footballers
English football managers
Notts County F.C. players
Bradford City A.F.C. players
Wisbech Town F.C. players
English Football League players
Association football fullbacks
Sydney United 58 FC managers
English expatriate footballers
English expatriate football managers
English expatriate sportspeople in Australia
Expatriate soccer players in Australia
Expatriate soccer managers in Australia